Siege of Samarkand may refer to multiple sieges of Samarkand:

Siege of Samarkand (1220), in which the Mongols captured the city
Siege of Samarkand (1490s), a siege or series of two sieges of the city in either 1494 or 1496
Siege of Samarkand (1497), a siege of the city in May 1497 in which Babur successfully captured the city
Siege of Samarkand (1501), a siege of the city in 1501 in which Babur failed to capture the city
Siege of Samarkand (1868), a nine day siege in which a Russian garrison successful repelled an attacking army of the Bukharan Emirate